Lothrop (also Lothrup) is an unincorporated community in Missoula County, Montana, United States.

Notable person
George Theodore Boileau, American Roman Catholic bishop

Notes

Unincorporated communities in Missoula County, Montana
Unincorporated communities in Montana